Vice-Admiral Drew W. Robertson CMM, MSM, CD is a retired officer of the Canadian Forces. He was Chief of the Maritime Staff from 17 January 2006 to 22 June 2009.

Career
Robertson joined the Canadian Forces in 1973. He became commander of the destroyer  in 1995 and of the destroyer  in 1999 before commanding the First Canadian Task Group during the Operation Apollo anti-terrorism deployment in 2001. He went on to be Director General of international security policy at National Defence Headquarters in 2003 and Chief of the Maritime Staff in 2006 before retiring in 2009.

Awards and decorations
Robertson's personal awards and decorations include the following:

105px

105px

References

Living people
Royal Canadian Navy officers
Commanders of the Order of Military Merit (Canada)
Recipients of the Meritorious Service Decoration
Canadian admirals
Year of birth missing (living people)
Commanders of the Royal Canadian Navy